Corrado Verdelli (born 30 September 1963, in Lodi) is an Italian professional football coach and a former player.

Playing career
Verdelli started his senior career with amateur club Oltrepò. In 1986, he was signed by Internazionale, but then sent on loan to Monza in 1987; in his season with Monza, he provided a key contribution to the club's historical promotion to Serie B, and was subsequently awarded with a place in the main Internazionale roster for the 1988–89 season. During that season, Verdelli played mostly as a backup, appearing twenty times in the Giovanni Trapattoni-led team that won the Serie A title with just two defeats. In 1990, he left Internazionale for Cremonese, where he played for seven consecutive seasons, became a mainstay and one of the most recognizable footballers of the Grigiorossi team that played in the top flight for four years. He retired in 1998 after a lone season with minor league team Fanfulla.

Coaching career
In 1999 Verdelli started a coaching career as head of Fanfulla until 2001. He was successively appointed youth coach of Internazionale, winning a Campionato Nazionale Primavera and a Torneo di Viareggio. In 2003, he was named assistant to Héctor Cúper, and served as caretaker for a spare week after the Argentine's dismissal.

In 2004 Verdelli was appointed head coach of Serie B club Ternana, but was replaced by Giovanni Vavassori a few weeks later. He then served as head coach also at Cremonese and Voghera, still with little luck. He successively worked as head coach of amateurs Pontisola in the 2009–2010 Serie D season, leading the club to third place. His return to professional coaching happened in the following season, as he was appointed boss of bottom-placed Lega Pro Prima Divisione club Monza in November 2010; Verdelli however failed to drive the club out of the relegation zone and found himself again in last place a few weeks before the end of the season, being consequently removed from his coaching duties on 30 March 2011.

Honours

Player
Inter
 Serie A champion: 1988–89.
 Supercoppa Italiana winner: 1989.

References

External links

1963 births
Living people
Italian footballers
Serie A players
Serie B players
Serie C players
Inter Milan players
A.C. Monza players
U.S. Cremonese players
Italian football managers
Inter Milan managers
Ternana Calcio managers
U.S. Cremonese managers
A.C. Voghera managers
A.C. Monza managers
A.C. Ponte San Pietro Isola S.S.D. managers
Association football defenders
A.S.D. Fanfulla players
A.S.D. Fanfulla managers